Derrick Shapande is a retired Zambian football defender.

References

Year of birth missing (living people)
Living people
Zambian footballers
Zambia international footballers
Young Arrows F.C. players
Red Arrows F.C. players
Association football defenders